Caryocolum petryi is a moth of the family Gelechiidae. It is found in France, Germany, Austria, Switzerland, Italy, Slovenia, former Yugoslavia, Hungary, Latvia, Lithuania, Sweden and Finland. It is also found in Mongolia and Siberia (Tuva).

The length of the forewings is 4–7 mm for males and 4–6 mm for females. The forewings are grey, dark brown or sometimes black, becoming orange-brown at the dorsal margin, across the wing near the base and in the middle. Adults have been recorded on wing from late June to early September.

The larvae feed on Gypsophila repens. They feed between spun leaves, where pupation also takes place. Larvae can be found from June to August.

Subspecies
Caryocolum petryi petryi
Caryocolum petryi benanderi (Hering, 1933) (Sweden)

References

Moths described in 1899
petryi
Moths of Europe
Moths of Asia